Teen Punks in Heat is the eleventh studio album by the American punk rock band Screeching Weasel. It was released in September 2000 through Panic Button Records. Though receiving mixed reviews from national critics, it was championed upon its release by many critics in the band's Chicago hometown.Shortly after the release of the album, the band played two sold out shows at Chicago's House of Blues, their first live performances in seven years. Rumors of a full tour to promote the album swirled, but the band announced their break-up before any plans were confirmed.

The album features a cover of Italian pop punk band The Manges' "I Will Always Do."

Track listing
All songs written by Ben Weasel, except where noted.
"Bottom of the 9th" - 0:54
"Gotta Girlfriend" - 1:33
"Too Worked Up" - 1:54
"I'll Stop the Rain" - 2:45
"I Love You" - 1:10
"Molecule" - 1:28
"21 Months" - 1:38
"The First Day of Autumn" - 1:38
"Erection" - 1:54
"I Will Always Do" (The Manges) - 3:09
"You're the Enemy" - 0:47
"I Wanna Fuck" - 1:02
"Cat-Like" - 0:44
"Pauline" - 0:58
"Things Seem All Fucked Up Today" - 1:20
"Message in a Beer Bottle" - 1:30
"You're Sorry Now" - 1:26
"Don't Want It" - 3:10
"Six Percent" - 2:10
"The Edge of the World" - 5:06

Personnel
 Ben Weasel - lead vocals
 Phillip Hill - lead guitar, backing vocals
 Jughead - rhythm guitar
 Mass Giorgini - bass, backing vocals
 Dan Lumley - drums

References

Screeching Weasel albums
2000 albums